La Poste de Djibouti, is the public operator responsible for postal service in Djibouti.

See also
 Communications in Djibouti

Reference

Companies of Djibouti
Djibouti